Death to the Planet is an EP by British jazz/electronica trio The Comet Is Coming. It was released by The Leaf Label as part of Record Store Day 2017.

Background
Death to the Planet is the third release by the London-based group. It follows their initial EP, Prophecy (2015), and their Mercury Prize nominated debut album Channel the Spirits (2016).
It was released on limited edition orange vinyl for Record Store Day, with a subsequent release on black vinyl.
The EP was described by Record Store Day as "the sound of total planetary destruction, produced with laser-guided accuracy and aimed directly at the dancefloor" and by The Leaf Label as "[documenting] a collaborative approach to composition through spontaneous improvisation". The record was re-released as a limited edition of 500 by Rough Trade Records in July 2018.

Track listing

Personnel 
 King Shabaka – tenor saxophone
 Danalogue The Conqueror – keys
 Betamax Killer – drums

References 

2017 albums
The Comet Is Coming albums